The Kampala–Bombo Expressway is a proposed four-lane, dual carriage highway in the Central Region of Uganda, connecting, Kampala , the capital city, and Bombo, in Luweero District.

Location
The road starts at Wandegeya in the Kawempe Division of Kampala, Uganda's capital city. The approximate coordinates of the road, near the town of Matugga are 0°28'28.0"N, 32°31'06.0"E (Latitude:0.474440; Longitude:32.518338).

Overview
The government of Uganda plans to widen the current bitumen-surfaced road to a four-lane dual carriage highway, as part of efforts to decongest Kampala. It is planned to fund the road construction under a public-private partnership (PPP) arrangement.

Construction costs
As at February 2016, the construction budget for the highway has not been developed, pending finalization of road design.

See also
 List of roads in Uganda

References

External links
 Uganda National Road Authority Homepage
  Ugandan Government Increases Road Network Funding
 The government plans to build 4 Turnpikes

Roads in Uganda
Kampala District
Wakiso District
Luweero District